Swine railway station was a railway station that served the village of Swine in the East Riding of Yorkshire, England. It was on the Hull and Hornsea Railway.

It opened on 28 March 1864, and closed following the Beeching Report on 19 October 1964.

References

External links

 Swine station on navigable 1947 O. S. map

Disused railway stations in the East Riding of Yorkshire
Railway stations in Great Britain opened in 1864
Railway stations in Great Britain closed in 1964
Former North Eastern Railway (UK) stations
Beeching closures in England